The Cairo Ohio River Bridge is a cantilever bridge carrying U.S. Route 51, U.S. Route 60, and U.S. Route 62  across the Ohio River between Wickliffe, Kentucky  and Cairo, Illinois.  Of all the Ohio River crossings, it is the furthest downstream; the Mississippi River can be seen while crossing the bridge and looking westward.

This is an authorized truck route.

History
Construction was awarded to Modjeski and Masters and the Mt. Vernon Bridge Co. It was finished on November 11, 1938, and tolls were removed ten years later. The Cairo Ohio River Bridge was rehabilitated in 1979 and is eligible for listing on the National Register of Historic Places.

See also
List of crossings of the Ohio River

External links

Cairo Ohio River Bridge (US 51, US 60, US 62) at Bridges & Tunnels

References

Road bridges in Illinois
Bridges of the United States Numbered Highway System
Bridges over the Ohio River
U.S. Route 51
U.S. Route 60
U.S. Route 62
Buildings and structures in Ballard County, Kentucky
Cairo, Illinois
Bridges completed in 1938
Bridges in Alexander County, Illinois
Road bridges in Kentucky
Great River Road
Steel bridges in the United States
Cantilever bridges in the United States